Offner is a surname. Notable people with the surname include:
Arnold A. Offner, (1937-), American historian
Deborah Offner, American actress
Elliot Offner (1931–2010), American sculptor
Mortimer Offner (1900–1965), American photographer
Paul Offner (1942–2004), American educator, public health expert and legislator
Raymond Offner (1927–1989), French basketball player
Richard Offner (1889-1965), Austrian-American art historian
Stacy Offner, American rabbi

See also
Ofner